Arnold Wight (born 22 April 1926) was a Guyanese cricketer. He played in three first-class matches for British Guiana in 1946/47 and 1947/48.

See also
 List of Guyanese representative cricketers

References

External links
 

1926 births
Possibly living people
Guyanese cricketers
Guyana cricketers
Sportspeople from Georgetown, Guyana